Belén (Chile) is a village in the Arica and Parinacota Region, Chile. Belen has a population of 27 people which is declining.

References

Populated places in Parinacota Province